Micah "Katt" Williams (born September 2, 1971) is an American stand-up comedian and actor. He played Money Mike in Friday After Next, had a stint on Wild 'n Out, portrayed Bobby Shaw in My Wife and Kids, provided the voice of A Pimp Named Slickback in The Boondocks and Seamus in Cats & Dogs: The Revenge of Kitty Galore, and portrayed Lord Have Mercy in Norbit. In 2008, he voiced himself in the video game Grand Theft Auto IV.

Early life
Williams was born Micah Williams on September 2, 1971, in Cincinnati, Ohio, and raised in Dayton, Ohio. He emancipated himself from his parents at the age of 13, moved to Florida and supported himself as a street vendor.

Career

Stand-up career
Williams started performing comedy in his Cincinnati neighborhood, Avondale.

He honed his comic delivery by performing his routine in clubs nationwide, from Oklahoma to Oakland. By 1999, he had become an established comic, appearing on stage at the likes of The Improv, The Comedy Club, The Ice House, and The Hollywood Park Casino. Most notably, he appeared on BET's Comic View as Katt "In the Hat" Williams.

He starred in his first comedy special in 2006 entitled Katt Williams: Live: Let a Playa Play. His first HBO stand-up special was 2006's The Pimp Chronicles, Pt. 1. In 2007 he was offered a movie/standup which he entitled American Hustle. The film had critical success and established Williams as a mainstream comedian. In 2008 he released his second HBO comedy special, entitled It's Pimpin' Pimpin''', which included more political standup. Keeping busy releasing comedy DVDs and touring, Williams had a comedy tour that was named the best of 2008 by Billboard. In 2012, after a four-year hiatus, he returned to stand-up in his third HBO comedy special, entitled Kattpacalypse.

On December 3, 2012, Williams announced the end of his stand-up comedy career, a day after a bizarre incident at a bar in Seattle, Washington, that landed him in jail. However, just three days later, he announced he was coming out of retirement.

During late 2013, Williams was on his "Growth Spurt" Tour.

On August 16, 2014, he returned with a new HBO special titled Katt Williams: Priceless: Afterlife, which was directed by Spike Lee.

On September 3, 2015, during an interview, Williams announced and described his upcoming tour entitled "Conspiracy Theory", stating,

The conspiracy conversation is a conversation that we are all familiar with. We know that there are conspiracies out there, but this is a conversation that encompasses a lot of things that aren't being discussed other places. That's the basis for all conspiracy theories: the fact that there is hidden information out there, and how our process changes about things that we thought we used to know. We all, at some point, if we're are at a certain age, we grew up thinking Pluto was a planet. This is probably going to go down as one of my finest works, just because it's a collection of forbidden topics that we can't seem to get answered. I am one of the rare urban public officials. Part of my guarantee in my ticket price is that I'm going to be talking about what we are talking about now, and discussing from now to the next time we see [me] again. This is the open discussion that we've had since 2003. This is what it is about.

In 2018, Williams released a new stand-up special on Netflix, shot in Jacksonville, Florida, titled Great America.

On May 17, 2022, Williams released a new stand-up special on Netflix, titled World War III.

Film and television career
In 2002, Williams made his acting debut on NYPD Blue. He gained notoriety on Wild 'n Out, in which he appeared for several seasons. He appeared in the official music video for Wild 'n Out colleague Nick Cannon's single "Gigolo" in 2003.

In 2007, Williams provided the voice of A Pimp Named Slickback in The Boondocks. He plays himself as an on-stage stand-up comedian in Grand Theft Auto IV performing several routines, including an abbreviated version of one of his routines from Katt Williams: American Hustle. He has appeared in several episodes of My Wife and Kids as character Bobby Shaw. He was the roastmaster of the Comedy Central Roast of Flavor Flav.

Williams has also played supporting characters in films, such as First Sunday and Norbit, but is more widely recognized for his character Money Mike in Friday After Next.

In 2018, he played the character Willy in the season 2 premiere of Atlanta, for which he won the Primetime Emmy Award for Outstanding Guest Actor in a Comedy Series.

Music career
Williams has also used the "Money Mike" stage name when rapping for songs by such artists as Baby Bash, The Game, and Suga Free. In 2006 Williams joined New York rapper Cam'ron's group the Diplomats, but was never signed as an official artist for the label. On January 29, 2009, Williams released his debut studio/live album, entitled It's Pimpin' Pimpin'. On November 19, 2013, he and Hell Rell released a diss song to Atlanta rapper Trinidad James entitled "Lames In The Game" due to comments made by the rapper about the state of current hip hop music.

Incidents at live shows
On August 27, 2011, Williams's performance at the Celebrity Theatre in Phoenix, Arizona, was marred by an incident during which he responded to a heckler, identified as being of Mexican descent, with an angry tirade that included Williams shouting "...so if you love Mexico, bitch, get the fuck over there!" In an interview following the performance, Williams stated that the incident was precipitated by the heckler. "If a person starts their heckling with 'f' America, then that gives me the right to defend my country." He offered no apology for his remarks during the performance, stating, "I don't think I need to apologize for being pro-American."

Two live performances in November 2012 ended early because of Williams' confrontational behavior. A November 1 performance at the Wells Fargo Theatre in Denver ended after he jumped off the stage to confront a heckler. A November 16 performance at the Oracle Arena in Oakland ended after Williams again entered into a profanity-laced confrontation with a heckler and was assisted off stage by his own security staff.

Legal issues
On November 13, 2006, Williams was arrested at Los Angeles International Airport after a stolen gun was found in his briefcase. On December 14, 2006, he pleaded no contest to a misdemeanor count of carrying a concealed firearm and was sentenced to three years' probation, was ordered to pay restitution, and was given credit for the three days he spent in jail.

In November 2010, Williams was arrested by police while working on a film in Coweta County, Georgia. He was accused of stealing $3,500 worth of coins and jewelry. He was released the following day on a $40,000 bond. Police later charged him with burglary and criminal trespass.

On June 11, 2011, Williams was arrested in connection with an alleged assault on a tractor driver. The alleged victim said three women approached his tractor at around 4:30 p.m. local time and attacked him with rocks and dirt clods, causing him facial injuries. Los Angeles County Sheriff's Department officers arrived on the scene and arrested the three women for assault with a deadly weapon, and arrested Williams for felony intimidation of a witness. Williams was booked into jail and released that same night on $50,000 bail.

On November 15, 2012, he was arrested in Oakland, California, on charges of suspicion of assault with a deadly weapon for allegedly beating an 18-year-old Berkeley, California, man with a bottle aboard Williams' tour bus.

An attendee of Williams' shortened November 16, 2012 performance at the Oracle Arena in Oakland filed a class action lawsuit days after the event, seeking compensation for himself and "all others who paid money for a show and got nothing but Katt Williams' nonperformance."

On December 2, 2012, Williams was arrested in Seattle after he allegedly got into a dispute at a bar in South Lake Union. His arrest came after his no-show November 29, 2012, for the first night of a planned two-night engagement at the Paramount Theatre. Five days later, he was arrested in Dunnigan, California, on a bench warrant arising from a November 25, 2012, incident in Sacramento during which he allegedly drove a three-wheeled motorbike on a sidewalk and refused to stop for police. The resulting chase was halted due to safety concerns, and the bench warrant issued, after Williams narrowly missed several bystanders.

On December 28, 2012, Williams was arrested in Los Angeles on child endangerment charges. He was held in lieu of $100,000 bail, and his four children were placed in protective custody.

On January 8, 2013, he was arrested at his LA home after failing to appear in Sacramento to answer the November 25 motorbike charges.

On October 29, 2014, Williams and Suge Knight were arrested for the theft of a camera from a photographer in Beverly Hills on September 5. In April 2017, Williams pled no contest to the charge of robbery and was ordered to undertake a year of anger management charges as well as receiving three years' probation.

On February 29, 2016, Williams was arrested in Gainesville, Georgia, when a clerk at a swimming-pool store said Williams had hit him. Williams was lying face down with his hands behind his back when police arrived.

On March 23, 2016 a video went viral of Williams getting into a fight with a 17 year old boy following a dispute during a soccer game in Gainesville. The authorities planned to review the incident with the D.A. in addition to his ongoing court cases.

On April 27, 2016, Williams was arrested in Atlanta, Georgia, and charged with battery after allegedly throwing a salt shaker at the manager of Spondivits, a local restaurant. The manager claimed to have been hit in the mouth with the salt shaker when Williams' group was denied preferential seating.

He was arrested on July 24, 2016, on suspicion of battery after an altercation with a woman at the Sportsman's Lodge, a hotel in Sherman Oaks, California.

On September 15, 2016, Williams was arrested in Fulton County, Georgia, on a charge of second-degree criminal damage to property, after having turned himself in on a warrant for failing to appear in court for the April 27 incident. This new arrest involved a February 28, 2016 allegation that the comedian had thrown a man's cellphone.

On October 6, 2018, Williams was arrested in Portland, Oregon, on a charge of assault in the fourth degree, after he assaulted a Town Car driver during an argument about his dog. He was additionally arrested on an outstanding warrant from Georgia.

Personal life
Williams briefly joined the Nation of Islam while living in the San Francisco Bay Area. He often wears the cross during his shows as a symbol of his Christian faith.

Williams has one biological son and seven adopted children.

Awards and nominations
In 2007, Williams was nominated for the Teen Choice Awards Choice Comedian Award.

In 2018, he won the Emmy for Outstanding Guest Actor in a Comedy Series for his appearance on the show Atlanta''.

Filmography

Film

Television

Stand-up comedy specials

Video games

Discography

References

External links

 
 
 VIBE profile

1971 births
Living people
Television producers from Ohio
American male voice actors
American male film actors
American male television actors
African-American stand-up comedians
American stand-up comedians
African-American male actors
African-American male comedians
American male comedians
African-American Christians
Male actors from Dayton, Ohio
Primetime Emmy Award winners
Rappers from Cincinnati
Warner Records artists
Former Nation of Islam members
21st-century American male actors
20th-century American comedians
21st-century American comedians
Converts to Christianity from Islam